Janine Reynaud (13 August 1930 – 13 May 2018) was a French film actress best known for her appearances in several films by director Jesús Franco, in particularly the 1968 film Succubus.

Biography
Reynaud was born in Paris, France in 1930.

She appeared in the films Six Days a Week and  Mission to Caracas (both 1965) before starring in several films directed by Jesús Franco, including Kiss Me Monster (1967) and Succubus (1968). 

Reynaud was married to her Succubus co-star Michel Lemoine for a time, though they eventually separated. Reynaud retired to the United States, settling in Texas. She died on 13 May 2018 in Sugar Land, a suburb of Houston.

Selected filmography
 Six Days a Week (1965)
 Mission to Caracas (1965)
 Bob Fleming... Mission Casablanca (1966)
 Special Code: Assignment Lost Formula (1966)
 Kiss Me Monster (1967)
 Succubus (1968)
 The Black Hand (1968)
 Human Cobras (1971)
 The Case of the Scorpion's Tail (1971)

References

Bibliography

External links 
 

1930 births
2018 deaths
Actresses from Paris
French film actresses
French expatriate actresses in the United States